Leonardo is a genus of moths of the family Crambidae.

Species
Leonardo avicennae Bassi, 1990
Leonardo davincii Bleszynski, 1965

References

Crambinae
Taxa named by Stanisław Błeszyński
Crambidae genera